Past, Present & Future is a 2003 retrospective collection of the music of Rob Zombie. It includes selections of his work with White Zombie and his solo career, as well as two previously unreleased tracks. It won a Metal Edge Readers' Choice Award for Compilation Album of the Year.

The explicit version includes a bonus DVD with ten of Rob Zombie's / White Zombie's music videos; all are edited versions.

Track listing

Lyrics
1 Richard Raymond Finch, Harry Wayne Casey
2 Lionel B. Richie, Ronald LaPread, Walter Orange, Milan Williams, Thomas McClary, William King
3 Jeffrey Hyman, John Cummings, Douglas Colvin, Thomas Erdelyi

A version of "Girl on Fire" remixed by Danny Lohner entitled (Resident Renholder Mix) was also later released on the Resident Evil: Apocalypse soundtrack.

DVD track listing

Chart positions

Album

Singles

References

2003 greatest hits albums
Albums produced by Scott Humphrey
Rob Zombie albums
Geffen Records compilation albums